Symmoca oenophila is a moth of the family Autostichidae. It is found in France, Portugal and Spain.

The wingspan is 16–18 mm.

References

Moths described in 1871
Symmoca
Moths of Europe